Kanya Kounvongsa (born 28 May 1990 in Vientiane) is a Laotian football player who plays for Vientiane. He is a member of the Laos national football team.

See also
Football in Laos

References

1990 births
Living people
People from Vientiane
Laotian footballers
Laos international footballers
Association footballers not categorized by position
21st-century Laotian people